Lino at Large is a weekly radio talk show hosted by American media personality Lino Rulli that aired from 2004–2012. A podcast of the show was released weekly via iTunes. It also aired on The Catholic Channel on Sirius XM Satellite Radio and was syndicated throughout North America. Lino at Large featured comedic segments directed to young Catholic adults. The show was sponsored by the United States Conference of Catholic Bishops, specifically the Catholic Communication Campaign.

See also
 The Catholic Guy

References

External links
 Lino at Large

American talk radio programs
Catholic radio programs